The 1949 Milan–San Remo was the 40th edition of the Milan–San Remo cycle race and was held on 19 March 1949. The race started in Milan and finished in San Remo. The race was won by Fausto Coppi of the  team.

General classification

References

1949
1949 in road cycling
1949 in Italian sport
1949 Challenge Desgrange-Colombo
March 1949 sports events in Europe